The Norwalk–La Mirada Unified School District (NLMUSD) is a school district in Los Angeles County, California, United States, with its headquarters in Norwalk. It has schools in both Norwalk and La Mirada areas. The school district serves most of Norwalk and La Mirada and Santa Fe Springs (the NLM portion of Santa Fe Springs contains only business areas, no residents). John Lopez has been the superintendent of the school district since the 2020–2021 school year.

List of Schools

Elementary schools
 Gardenhill Elementary School, La Mirada 
 John Foster Dulles Elementary School, La Mirada 
 Foster Road Elementary School, La Mirada 
 Escalona Elementary School, La Mirada 
 New River Elementary School, Norwalk 
 Arturo Sanchez Elementary School, Norwalk 
 Earl E. Edmondson Elementary School, Norwalk 
 Eastwood Elementary School, La Mirada  
 La Pluma Elementary School, La Mirada 
 John Dolland Elementary School, Norwalk 
 Anna M. Glazier Elementary School, Norwalk 
 D.D. Johnston Elementary School, Norwalk 
 Loretta Lampton Elementary School, Norwalk 
 Thomas B. Moffitt Elementary School, Norwalk 
 Julia M. Morrison Elementary School, Norwalk 
 John H. Nuffer Elementary School, Norwalk

Middle schools
 Arlie F. Hutchinson Middle School (STEM Academy), La Mirada 
 Benton Middle School Visual and Performing Arts Academy, La Mirada 
 Corvallis Middle School of Arts & Technology Magnet, Norwalk 
 Los Alisos STEM Magnet Middle School, Norwalk 
 Nettie L. Waite Middle School, Norwalk

Adult schools
 Excelsior Adult School

High schools
 John H. Glenn High School, Norwalk
 La Mirada High School, La Mirada
 Norwalk High School, Norwalk

Continuation school
 El Camino High School, La Mirada

References

External links

 

School districts in Los Angeles County, California
Education in La Mirada, California
Norwalk, California
Educational institutions in the United States with year of establishment missing
1965 establishments in California
School districts established in 1965